This is a list of electoral division results for the Australian 1987 federal election for the Australian Capital Territory and the Northern Territory.
__toc__

Australian Capital Territory

Canberra

Fraser

Northern Territory

Northern Territory

See also 
 Results of the 1987 Australian federal election (House of Representatives)
 Members of the Australian House of Representatives, 1987–1990

References 

Territories 1987